The Johannesberg Ladies Open was a women's professional golf tournament on the Swedish Golf Tour, played between 2017 and 2020. It was always held at Johannesberg Golf Club near Stockholm, Sweden.

Winners

References

Swedish Golf Tour (women) events